Petra was an ancient settlement belonging to ancient Elis. Pausanias writes that it was in the immediate neighbourhood of Elis and contained the tomb of the philosopher Pyrrho. Its precise location is unknown.

References

Populated places in ancient Elis
Former populated places in Greece
Lost ancient cities and towns